Ballogie is a locality in the South Burnett Region, Queensland, Australia.

Geography 
The Chinchilla Wondai Road passes east to west through the locality. The land is undulating ranging from 370 to 450 metres. The valleys have creeks running through them and this land is partially cleared and used for grazing. The higher areas are generally undeveloped.

Education 
There are no schools in Ballogie. The nearest primary schools are in Proston, Tingoora and Durong.

Amenities 
The Ballogie branch of the Queensland Country Women's Association meet at Seiler Road.

References 

South Burnett Region
Localities in Queensland